CVT16 may refer to:

CVT16 instruction set, an instruction set for the Bulldozer processor produced by AMD due to enter production in 2011
, an aircraft carrier operated by the United States Navy from 1943 until 1991, after which she became a museum ship located in Corpus Christi, Texas